This Chinese calendar correspondence table shows the stem/branch year names, correspondences to the Western (Gregorian) calendar, and other related information for the current, 79th Sexagenary cycle of the Chinese calendar based on the 2697 BC epoch or the 78th cycle if using the 2637 BC epoch.

Footnotes

Astronomy
Specific calendars